Auriol Island is an island at the southern end of the Mergui Archipelago, Burma. Its highest point is 183 m and is located at its western end. The island is densely wooded, and lies 4.5 km south of Breuer Island.

References

Mergui Archipelago
Tanintharyi Region